Leading is the amount of added vertical spacing between lines of type.

Leading may also refer to:

 Leading actor, the actor who plays the role of the protagonist in a film or play
 Leading Comics, a comic book published by what is now DC Comics during the 1940s and early 1950s
 Leading question, a question that suggests the answer or contains the information for which the examiner is searching in common law systems
 Leading-tone, a note resolves to a note one semitone higher or lower in music theory
 Voice leading, a decision-making consideration when arranging voices in musical composition
 Leadership, an ability to lead

See also
 Leading Creek (disambiguation)
 Lead (disambiguation)
 Leader (disambiguation)